The 2016 Tour de Ski was the 10th edition of the Tour de Ski. The Stage World Cup event began in Lenzerheide, Switzerland on January 1, 2016, and ended in Val di Fiemme, Italy on January 10, 2016. The cups were being defended by Marit Bjørgen (Norway) and Petter Northug (Norway).

Schedule

Overall leadership

Final standings

Overall standings

Sprint standings

Stages

Stage 1
1 January 2016, Lenzerheide, Switzerland

Stage 2
2 January 2016, Lenzerheide, Switzerland

Stage 3
3 January 2016, Lenzerheide, Switzerland

Stage 4
5 January 2016, Oberstdorf, Germany

Stage 5
6 January 2016, Oberstdorf, Germany

Stage 6
8 January 2016, Toblach, Italy

Stage 7
9 January 2016, Val di Fiemme, Italy

Stage 8
10 January 2016, Val di Fiemme, Italy

References

2015–16 FIS Cross-Country World Cup
2016
2016 in German sport
2016 in Swiss sport
2016 in Italian sport
2016 in cross-country skiing
January 2016 sports events in Europe